Skalina is a village in Dzhebel Municipality, Kardzhali Province, southern Bulgaria.

Skalina Point on Smith Island, Antarctica is named after the village.

References

Villages in Kardzhali Province